Kenneth Robert Gernander (born June 30, 1969) is an American professional ice hockey coach and former player who played 12 games in the National Hockey League with the New York Rangers between 1996 and 2004. Born in Coleraine, Minnesota, he played for the University of Minnesota for four years and was drafted by the Winnipeg Jets in the fifth round of the 1987 NHL Entry Draft.

Playing career
Gernander played 14 professional seasons, the last 11 in the New York Rangers organization with their AHL affiliates in Binghamton (1994–1997) and Hartford (1997–2005). He served as team captain for 10 years and led the Wolf Pack to a Calder Cup championship in 2000. He is the Wolf Pack's all-time franchise record-holder in games played (599) and playoff games played (78). Gernander also ranks second all-time in goals (160), assists (187) and points (347) in Hartford franchise history. Despite these accomplishments, Gernander was rarely called up to play for the Rangers; he appeared in only 27 NHL games over the course of his career.

Gernander retired after the 2004–05 season. He is the AHL's all-time leader with 123 career playoff games played and is the league's all-time leading scorer among American-born players with 624 points in 973 games.

Coaching career
After his retirement, Gernander spent two seasons as Hartford's assistant coach. On July 23, 2007, the Wolf Pack announced that Gernander would replace Jim Schoenfeld as head coach when Schoenfeld had been promoted to assistant general manager of the New York Rangers and general manager of the Wolf Pack. Gernander was fired as head coach of the Hartford Wolf Pack on May 16, 2017.

Gernander's number 12 is the only number retired by the Wolf Pack. It was retired on October 8, 2005.

Gernander is currently a scout for the New York Islanders.

Career statistics

Regular season and playoffs

Coaching record

Awards and honors

References

External links
 

1969 births
Living people
American men's ice hockey right wingers
Binghamton Rangers players
Fort Wayne Komets players
Hartford Wolf Pack players
Ice hockey coaches from Minnesota
Ice hockey players from Minnesota
Minnesota Golden Gophers men's ice hockey players
Moncton Hawks players
New York Islanders scouts
New York Rangers executives
New York Rangers players
People from Coleraine, Minnesota
Winnipeg Jets (1979–1996) draft picks